Niall Andrew Hogan (born 20 April 1971) is an Irish orthopaedic surgeon and a former Irish rugby union international player who played as a scrum-half.
He played for the Ireland team from 1995 to 1997, winning 13 caps. He was a member of the Ireland squad at the 1995 Rugby World Cup where he played in three matches.  Hogan is a former Ireland team captain.

Education
Hogan graduated from the Royal College of Surgeons in Ireland (RCSI) in 1995 with a degree in medicine (MB BCh LRCP&SI).  In 2005, he was conferred with the Intercollegiate Board Specialty Diploma in Trauma and Orthopaedic Surgery.  Hogan is Honorary Secretary to the Irish Institute of Trauma and Orthopaedic Surgery.  His brother Brian Hogan is a radiologist and fellow RCSI graduate.

References

External links

1971 births
Living people
Irish rugby union players
Ireland international rugby union players
Irish orthopaedic surgeons
Alumni of the Royal College of Surgeons in Ireland
Rugby union scrum-halves
Rugby union players from Dublin (city)
London Irish players
Irish expatriate rugby union players
Irish expatriate sportspeople in England
Expatriate rugby union players in England